Pierre Raymond Savard (29 June 1927 – 20 July 2021) was a Liberal party member of the House of Commons of Canada. His career included various business interests including merchandising, administration and store ownership. Savard entered national politics at Quebec's Verdun electoral district following a by-election victory on 24 May 1977. He was re-elected in the 1979 and 1980 federal elections, but defeated in 1984 by Gilbert Chartrand of the Progressive Conservative party. He served in the latter stages of the 30th Canadian Parliament, and for full terms in the 31st and 32nd Canadian Parliaments. He later served as the mayor of Verdun, Quebec from 1985 to 1993. Savard died on 20 July 2021 at the age of 94.

References

External links
 

1927 births
2021 deaths
French Quebecers
Liberal Party of Canada MPs
Members of the House of Commons of Canada from Quebec
People from Verdun, Quebec
Politicians from Montreal